The 2021 Norwegian First Division (referred to as OBOS-ligaen for sponsorship reasons) is a Norwegian second-tier football league season.

The league started on 15 May 2021, and ended on 27 November 2021.

HamKam earned promotion to Eliteserien on 6 November 2021, after a 1–0 win against Stjørdals-Blink. Aalesund secured their promotion in the penultimate round.

Teams

In the 2020 1. divisjon, Tromsø and Lillestrøm were promoted to the 2021 Eliteserien, while Kongsvinger and Øygarden were relegated to the 2021 2. divisjon.

Start and Aalesund were relegated from the 2020 Eliteserien, while Fredrikstad and Bryne were promoted from the 2020 2. divisjon.

Stadiums and locations

Managerial changes

League table

Results

Play-offs

Promotion play-offs

The teams from third to sixth place will take part in the promotion play-offs; these are single leg knockout matches. In the first round, the fifth-placed team will play at home against the sixth-placed team. The winner of the first round will meet the fourth-placed team on away ground in the second round. The winner of the second round will meet the third-placed team on away ground. The winner of the third round will advance to play the 14th-placed team in the Eliteserien on neutral ground in the Eliteserien play-offs for a spot in the top-flight next season.

First round

Second round

Third round

Relegation play-offs
The 14th-placed team, Stjørdals-Blink, took part in a two-legged play-off against the winners of the Second Division play-offs, Hødd, to decide who would play in the First Division next season.

Stjørdals-Blink won 5–3 on aggregate.

Season statistics

Top scorers

Top assists

References

Norwegian First Division seasons
2
Norway
Norway